(died 699) was a Japanese princess who lived during the Asuka period. She was a daughter of Emperor Tenji. Her mother was Lady Shikobuko (色夫古娘), daughter of Oshiumi no Miyakko Otatsu (忍海造小竜). Ōe's siblings included Prince Kawashima and Princess Izumi.

Ōe married Emperor Tenmu and gave birth to two sons: Prince Naga and Prince Yuge. After Emperor Tenmu's death, they were qualified to become the next Emperor, but neither did.

Japanese princesses
699 deaths
Year of birth unknown
Emperor Tenmu
7th-century Japanese women
Emperor Tenji
Daughters of emperors

References